Bulken Station is a railway station on the Bergensbanen railway line located in the village of Bulken in Voss municipality, Vestland county, Norway. The station is served by twelve daily departures in each direction by the Bergen Commuter Rail operated by Vy Tog. The station opened as part in 1883 as part of Vossebanen.

River surfing 
The Bulken Wave (Bulkenbølgen) is a well known river surfing wave located in the Vosso river about 500 meters from Bulken Station. The wave can be surfed when the water has a flow rate around 125 to 150 cubic meters per second. Average water temperature from May to July lies around 8 °C. Surfing here has been featured in Ekstremsportveko.

Average water flow and temperature

References

External links
 Jernbaneverket's page on Bulken

Railway stations in Voss
Railway stations on Bergensbanen
Railway stations opened in 1883
River surfing